Walras is a surname. Notable people with the surname include:

Auguste Walras (1801–1866), French school administrator and amateur economist
Léon Walras (1834–1910), French mathematical economist, son of Auguste

See also
Walrus (disambiguation)